A Captain's Honor is a 1982 French war film directed by Pierre Schoendoerffer.

Plot
A courtroom-drama about a dead Captain whose memory is publicly accused by a historian on TV, twenty years after his death. The story follows his widow's struggle to prove that he was not a murderer and did not practise torture while he was leading a ground unit during the Algerian war.

She decides to sue the man who accused him of being a torturer and thus begins an investigation which retraces the Captain's last two weeks, day by day.

The film uses numerous flashbacks depicting battle scenes in Algeria.

Cast
Nicole Garcia (Patricia Caron, the widow)
Jacques Perrin (Marcel Caron, the captain)
Georges Wilson (the barristers president)
Charles Denner (Gillard, the defense counsel)
Claude Jade (Valouin, the lawyer of the indictment)
Georges Marchal (General Keller, a witness)
Christophe Malavoy (Automarchi, a witness)
Jean Vigny (Prof. Paulet, a historian)
Florent Pagny ("la Ficelle")

External links

1982 films
Algerian War films
Films directed by Pierre Schoendoerffer
French war films
Films scored by Philippe Sarde
1980s war films
1980s French films
1980s French-language films